Unorganized territory may refer to:
 An unincorporated area in any number of countries
 One of the current or former territories of the United States that has not had a government "organized" with an "organic act" by the U.S. Congress
 Unorganized area, any geographic region in Canada that does not form part of a municipality or Indian reserve

See also
 Unorganized Borough, Alaska, an area without county-level government.
 Unparished area, areas of England outside any civil parish